Ercheia enganica is a species of moth of the family Erebidae first described by Charles Swinhoe in 1918. It is found in Indonesia, where it has been recorded from Enggano Island near Sumatra.

References

Moths described in 1918
Ercheiini
Moths of Indonesia
Taxa named by Charles Swinhoe